"Heaven's Trail (No Way Out)" is a song by American glam metal band Tesla. The song was released as the lead single from the group's second studio album, The Great Radio Controversy. The song peaked at #13 on the Billboard Mainstream Rock Songs chart on March 18, 1989.

Along with "Love Song" and "What You Give", "Heaven's Trail (No Way Out)" is considered to be one of the band's signature songs. The song's intro and outro features a slide guitar.

Reception
In his review of the album, AllMusic's Steve Huey called "Heaven's Trail (No Way Out)" one of Tesla's best songs. The song was called one of the 50 Metal Songs That Defined 1989 by Loudwire in 2019.

Track listing

Charts

Personnel
 Jeff Keith – lead vocals
 Tommy Skeoch – lead guitar, backing vocals
 Frank Hannon – rhythm guitar, slide guitar
 Brian Wheat – bass
 Troy Luccketta – drums

References

External links
 Official Music Video at YouTube

1989 songs
1989 singles
Tesla (band) songs
Geffen Records singles